Edvinas Gertmonas (born 1 June 1996) is a Lithuanian professional footballer who plays as a goalkeeper.

References

1996 births
Living people
Association football goalkeepers
Lithuanian expatriate footballers
Lithuanian footballers
Lithuania international footballers
Stade Rennais F.C. players
FK Atlantas players
FK Tauras Tauragė players
FK Žalgiris players
A Lyga players
Championnat National 2 players
Championnat National 3 players
Lithuanian expatriate sportspeople in France
Expatriate footballers in France